Bertrandite is a beryllium sorosilicate hydroxide mineral with composition: Be4Si2O7(OH)2. Bertrandite is a colorless to pale yellow orthorhombic mineral with a hardness of 6-7.

It is commonly found in beryllium rich pegmatites and is in part an alteration of beryl. Bertrandite often occurs as a pseudomorphic replacement of beryl. Associated minerals include beryl, phenakite, herderite, tourmaline, muscovite, fluorite and quartz.

It, with beryl, are ores of beryllium.

It was discovered near Nantes, France in 1883 and named after French mineralogist, Emile Bertrand (1844–1909).

One of the world's largest deposits of bertrandite is Spor Mountain, Thomas Range, Utah which is currently the source of most of the world's beryllium production.

See also
List of minerals
List of minerals named after people

References

Beryllium minerals
Sorosilicates
Orthorhombic minerals
Minerals in space group 36